Simon S. Lam is an American computer scientist. He retired in 2018 from The University of Texas at Austin as Professor Emeritus and Regents' Chair Emeritus in Computer Science #1. He made seminal and important contributions to transport layer security, packet network verification, as well as network protocol design, verification, and performance analysis. 

From 1991 to 1993, Simon Lam pioneered security for Internet applications. His most important research contribution to society is the invention of secure sockets and prototype implementation of the first secure sockets layer (named SNP) for Internet applications. This work was done in 1993 when WWW was still in its infancy.  SNP was published and presented at the 1994 USENIX Summer Technical Conference. Subsequent secure sockets layers (SSL and TLS), re-implemented several years later using key ideas first presented in SNP, enabled secure e-commerce on WWW and are widely used to secure email and many other Internet applications. For this contribution, Professor Lam and three graduate students in his research project won the 2004 ACM Software System Award. He was elected to the United States National Academy of Engineering in 2007.

Early life and education 
Simon S. Lam was born in Macau (when it was a Portuguese colony) in 1947 with the family name 林 (Lam) and the given name 善成 (Sin Sing or Shin Sing). His family moved to Hong Kong in 1959.  He received his secondary education from La Salle College, Kowloon, Hong Kong.  He left Hong Kong in 1966 to study Electrical Engineering at Washington State University on a scholarship.  He received the BSEE degree with Distinction in 1969 from Washington State University and was honored by the College of Engineering as the 1969 Outstanding Senior in Electrical Engineering.

Beginning Fall 1969, he attended graduate school at the UCLA School of Engineering on a 4-year Chancellor’s Teaching Fellowship. His doctoral dissertation on packet switching in a multi-access broadcast channel was supervised by Professor Leonard Kleinrock. From 1971 to 1974, he was a Postgraduate Research Engineer and later a Postdoctoral Scholar at the ARPA Network Measurement Center, UCLA, where he worked on the packet satellite project of ARPANET.

Career and professional service
From 1974 to 1977, he was a Research Staff Member at the IBM T. J. Watson Research Center, Yorktown Heights, New York. In August 1977, he joined The University of Texas at Austin as an Assistant Professor of Computer Science. He was promoted to Associate Professor in 1979, to Full Professor in 1983, appointed to the endowed David Bruton Jr. Centennial Professorship in 1985, and the Regents Chair in Computer Science #1 in 2001. He served as Department Chair from 1992 to 1994.  

Professor Lam was active in professional service for the networking research communities of ACM SIGCOMM, IEEE Computer Society, IEEE Communications Society, and National Science Foundation. His most notable professional service contributions include the following: He co-founded the influential ACM SIGCOMM Conference  and, as its first Technical Program Chair, promoted and hosted the inaugural conference in 1983 on the campus of The University of Texas at Austin. The conference was a huge success attended by ARPANET, CSNET, and European packet network researchers as well as many other computer scientists and engineers interested in the emergent packet switched networking techniques, protocols, and architectures.  Ten years later, in 1993, Professor Lam co-founded the International Conference on Network Protocols  sponsored by IEEE Computer Society. From 1994 to 1998, he was Editor-in-Chief of the IEEE/ACM Transactions on Networking which was the first journal jointly published by ACM and  IEEE.

Major awards

ACM SIGCOMM Award
Simon Lam received the 2004 ACM SIGCOMM Award for lifetime contribution to the field of communication networks with the citation "in recognition of his vision, breadth, and rigor in contributing to, among other areas: secure network communication, the analysis of network and multiaccess protocols, the analysis of queueing networks, and the design of mechanisms for quality of service."

National Academy of Engineering
In 2007, Simon Lam was elected to the United States National Academy of Engineering, widely considered among the highest honors to be earned in the engineering and technology professions, for "contributions to computer network protocols and network security services.”

ACM Software System Award for Secure Network Programming
Simon Lam received a grant in 1991 from the NSA INFOSEC University Research Program for a project entitled, “Applying a Theory of Modules and Interfaces to Security Verification.”  In this project, he led a research group that invented the concept of secure sockets for securing Internet applications (providing end-point authentication, data confidentiality, and data integrity).  In 1993, they implemented the first secure sockets layer, named Secure Network Programming (SNP), with the goal of achieving “secure network programming for the masses.”  They demonstrated SNP to the project's NSA program managers.  They presented the case for secure sockets and SNP performance results at the USENIX Summer Technical Conference, June 1994.
SNP was designed as an application sublayer on top of transport-layer sockets.  It provides to Internet applications a secure sockets API that closely resembles the sockets API.  The SNP approach was novel and a major change in the direction of network security research in 1993.  This approach enabled secure e-commerce a few years later.  SNP won the 2004 ACM Software System Award.  Today's secure sockets layers (SSL and TLS) designed and deployed later by industry are widely used for securing transactions between Web browsers and servers for e-commerce, as well as other Internet applications including email, instant messaging, and VoIP.

W. Wallace McDowell Award
He was awarded the 2004 W. Wallace McDowell Award with the citation “For outstanding fundamental contributions in network protocols and security services.”

References

External links
 Simon S. Lam homepage
 Simon S. Lam Major Awards page

Members of the United States National Academy of Engineering
Internet pioneers
Fellows of the Association for Computing Machinery
Fellow Members of the IEEE
University of Texas at Austin faculty
American computer scientists
Computer systems researchers
20th-century American scientists
21st-century American scientists
University of California, Los Angeles alumni
Washington State University alumni
1947 births
Living people